1622 Chacornac, provisional designation , is a stony Flora asteroid from the inner regions of the asteroid belt, approximately 9 kilometers in diameter. It was discovered on 15 March 1952, by French astronomer Alfred Schmitt at the Royal Observatory of Belgium in Uccle, and named after astronomer Jean Chacornac.

Orbit and classification 

The S-type asteroid is a member of the Flora family, one of the largest groups of stony asteroids. It orbits the Sun in the inner main-belt at a distance of 1.9–2.6 AU once every 3 years and 4 months (1,220 days). Its orbit has an eccentricity of 0.16 and an inclination of 6° with respect to the ecliptic. The first precovery was taken at Lowell Observatory in 1930, extending Chacornacs observation arc by 22 years prior to its official discovery observation.

Lightcurves 

Between 2009 and 2013, several rotational lightcurves for this asteroid were obtained from photometric observations at the Palomar Transient Factory and the Hunters Hill Observatory, as well as by astronomers Eric Barbotin and Raoul Behrend. Lightcurve analysis gave a rotation period between 11.48 and 12.20 hours with a brightness variation between 0.21 and 0.25 in magnitude.

Diameter and albedo 

According to the survey carried out by the Japanese Akari satellite, Chacornac measures 10.3 kilometers in diameter and its surface has an albedo of 0.224, while observations by NASA's Wide-field Infrared Survey Explorer with its subsequent NEOWISE mission gave a diameter of 8.4 kilometers and a high albedo of 0.36. The Collaborative Asteroid Lightcurve Link agrees with the results obtained by AKARI and assumes an albedo of 0.24 – derived from 8 Flora, the family's largest member and namesake – and calculates a diameter of 9.9 kilometers with an absolute magnitude of 12.2.

Naming 

This minor planet was named in memory of French astronomer Jean Chacornac (1823–1873), an early discoverer of minor planets himself, most notably 25 Phocaea. He also discovered the parabolic comet C/1852 K1 (Chacornac) in 1852 and independently discovered 20 Massalia. The lunar crater Chacornac also bears his name. The official  was published by the Minor Planet Center on 1 August 1978.

References

External links 
 Asteroid Lightcurve Database (LCDB), query form (info )
 Dictionary of Minor Planet Names, Google books
 Asteroids and comets rotation curves, CdR – Observatoire de Genève, Raoul Behrend
 Discovery Circumstances: Numbered Minor Planets (1)-(5000) – Minor Planet Center
 
 

001622
Discoveries by Alfred Schmitt
Named minor planets
19520315